James H. Davis may refer to:

 Jimmie Davis (James Houston Davis, 1899–2000), American singer and governor of Louisiana
 James H. Davis (congressman) (1853–1940), U.S. Representative from Texas